The Men's Individual Pursuit was a cycling event at the 1988 Summer Olympics in Seoul, South Korea which was held between 20 and 22 September 1988. There were a total number of 23 participants.

Qualification
4000 metre time trial, with the top 16 riders advancing.

Match round 

In the match round, the top 16 riders from the qualification round were matched together, 1 vs. 16, 2 vs. 15, 3 vs. 14, 4 vs. 13, etc. for the Round of 16. In the Round of 16, the winner of each match advanced to race in the Quarterfinals.

Round of 16 

Match 1

Match 2

Match 3

Match 4

Match 5

Match 6

Match 7

Match 8

Quarterfinal 

Match 1

Match 2

Match 3

Match 4

Semifinal 

Match 1

Match 2

Finals 

Bronze Medal Match

Gold Medal Match

References

External links
 Official Report

Track cycling at the 1988 Summer Olympics
Cycling at the Summer Olympics – Men's individual pursuit
Men's events at the 1988 Summer Olympics